Michael Dean Shelton (born January 16, 1977) is an American actor, activist, and photographer.  Making his television debut in 2006 on MTV's Punk'd, he appeared in several reality TV shows, PSAs, in addition to his humanitarian work to that focused on global poverty, food insecurity, mental illness, and lgbtq equality. Michael is also  an accomplished photographer  who currently divides his time between Little Rock, Arkansas and Los Angeles, California.

Early life
Born in rural Kansas, Michael was adopted by Doris J. Shelton and Gale A. Shelton. He attended Wellsville High School in Wellsville, Kansas  graduating in 1995.  After high school, he attended both Westmont College in Santa Barbara, California  and  California Lutheran University, graduating in 2000 with a Bachelor of Science degree in both Political Science and History.  Michael's mother died in 2012 and his father in 2018.  He has no siblings.

Career
Michael has spent most of his career in humanitarian and activism work centered around poverty, homelessness, food insecurity, and equality.

Michael has created a number of projects that have raised awareness and money for charities. Michael has worked for the Democratic National Committee, President Bill Clinton, Starlight Starbright Children's Foundation, Children's Hospital of Kansas City, served on the board for the Franklin County Habitat for Humanity

Charitable causes

In May 2008, Michael created Snapshots of Hope a project in which celebrity friends and acquaintances such as Snoop Dogg, Fran Drescher, Ringo Starr, and Julie Newmar used cameras donated by CVS to capture their version of hope.  The images were then auctioned off to benefit AIDS Research Alliance.

Continuing his long-term commitment to  AIDS/HIV activism, Michael, in October 2009, created a team for AIDS Project Los Angeles to raise awareness and money for those living with HIV/AIDS. He enlisted the help of celebrity friends, such as Kate Linder (The Young and the Restless) and Romi Dames (Hannah Montana), who came out to walk and utilized their fan bases to raise funds.

In December 2009, Michael created and co-hosted an event to raise money for the Leap Foundation at The Abby West Hollywood.

In May 2010, Michael Dean served on Liberty Hill's Honorary Host Committee for their annual Upton Sinclair Awards & Dinner.

Michael served on the host committee for Operation Smile's Annual Smile Gala on September 24, 2010, honoring Harrison Ford, John Stamos and Susan Casden in Los Angeles.  Michael states that "as both a philanthropist and activist, I am always proud to support the work of Operation Smile to help provide free corrective surgeries and new smiles for children around the world. In as little as 45 minutes and for as little as $240, Operation Smile can give a child new hope and a new chance in life".

Awards
Michael has received a number of awards and honors including a Special Congressional Recognition in 1997, Plaques of Appreciation from Heart to Heart International and the City of Ottawa, Kansas.  On November 5, 2010, Michael Dean was honored by Hope 4 Children with their inaugural Shining Star Philanthropist of the Year Award

References

Press links
 Hate Sarah Palin, But Leave the Kids Alone (Interview with Michael Dean Shelton)
 Interview with Michael Dean Shelton-Eerie Digest
 Rock Fashion Week L.A. style! (11-08)
 The Wake Review - A Brilliant Play, Impeccable Acting  LASplash.com 2010

External links
  Official Myyearbook.com Fan Page for Michael Dean Shelton 
 Official Facebook Fan Page for Michael Dean Shelton
  Michael Dean Shelton on Twitter
 Michael Dean Shelton Official Youtube Channel
 Michael Dean Shelton at Zimbio

1977 births
American activists
American philanthropists
Living people
Participants in American reality television series
Westmont College
California Lutheran University people
California Lutheran University alumni
California Lutheran University
Male actors from Arkansas
21st-century American male actors
Philanthropists from California